Martin Kohler (born 17 July 1985) is a Swiss former road racing cyclist, who rode professionally between 2018 and 2016 for the ,  and  squads.

He competed in the 2010 Giro d'Italia but had to withdraw in the second stage due to a crash.

Kohler won the Swiss National Time Trial Championships in 2011 and the Swiss National Road Race Championships in 2012.

Major results

2007
 1st Stage 4 Tour de l'Avenir
2008
 1st GP Kyburg
2011
 1st  Time trial, National Road Championships
2012
 1st  Road race, National Road Championships
2013
 3rd Road race, National Road Championships
2014
 1st  Sprints classification Tour de Romandie
 1st Stage 1 (TTT) Giro del Trentino
 4th Road race, National Road Championships

Grand Tour general classification results timeline

References

External links

Cyclingnews.com profile page

Swiss male cyclists
1985 births
Living people
People from Walenstadt
European Games competitors for Switzerland
Cyclists at the 2015 European Games
Sportspeople from the canton of St. Gallen
21st-century Swiss people